Estadio Departamental Libertad is a multi-purpose stadium in Pasto, Colombia. It is used mostly for football matches and is the home stadium of Deportivo Pasto. The stadium holds 20,000 people and was built in 1955.

In 2007 Pasto qualified for the Copa Libertadores, so the stadium was expanded to fit CONMEBOL requirements. The north stand was expanded, which completed the bowl of the stadium and made every side two tiers since before the renovation the north side was semi-open and had only one tier.

In 2019, the seating rows were painted, the lighting was upgraded, the changing rooms were renovated, and a large TV screen was installed. The renovations finished in December 2019. Around $20 million COL were used.

References

Estadio Departamental Libertad
Sports venues completed in 1954
Libertad
Multi-purpose stadiums in Colombia
Estadio Departamental Libertad